Lys is a commune in the Pyrénées-Atlantiques department in southwestern France.

Geography

Hydrography
The river , a 12.5 km long tributary of the Béez, passes through the village Lys. Several tributaries of the Landistou (Betbeder, Bonnasserre, Chourrup, Lazerau, Lespereu) also pass through the commune. The northern part of the commune is drained by the river , a 15.2 km long tributary of the Gave de Pau, and some of its tributaries (Gest, Herran, Luz de Casalis). The southern part of the commune is drained by the stream Ruisseau de la Fontaine de Mesplé (Béez basin), and its tributary Ruisseau de Subercase.

Localities and Hamlets
 lou Boscq
 Vic de Hoges de Baix
 Vic de Hoges de Haut
 Vic de Lis de Baix
 Vic de Lis de Haut

Surrounding Communities
 Sévignacq-Meyracq to the north
 Haut-de-Bosdarros to the northeast
 Bruges-Capbis-Mifaget to the east
 Sainte-Colome to the southwest
 Louvie-Juzon to the south

Toponymy
The name Lys appears as Lis-Sainte-Colomme (Lily Saint Colomme) from the 1721 census. The name comes from Gascony, and means 'flat land'.

History
Lys was formerly an annex of Sainte-Colome until it acquired municipality status in 1858.

Administration
The current mayor is Nadège Poueymirou Bouchet, in office since 2020.

The town is part of the following intercommunal structures:
 Communauté de communes de la Vallée d'Ossau (Ossau Valley)
 Syndicat de la perception d'Arudy
 SIVU d'assainissement (sanitation) de la vallée d'Ossau
 Ossau Valley water union
 Lower Ossau electric union

Population

Economy
The town's economy is primarily oriented toward agriculture and livestock (sheep, cattle, pigs, mules).

See also
 Ossau Valley
 Communes of the Pyrénées-Atlantiques department
 Sainte-Colome

References

Communes of Pyrénées-Atlantiques